Samad-e Deh-e Mardeh (also Romanized as Şamad-e Deh-e Mardeh) is a village in Qorqori Rural District, Qorqori District, Hirmand County, Sistan and Baluchestan Province, Iran. At the 2006 census, its population was 25, in 5 families.

References 

Populated places in Hirmand County